Laxman Vedu Valvi (born 23 June 1923) is an Indian politician. He was elected to the Lok Sabha, the lower house of the Parliament of India as a member of the Praja Socialist Party.

References

External links
Official biographical sketch in Parliament of India website

1923 births
Possibly living people
India MPs 1957–1962
India MPs 1962–1967
Lok Sabha members from Maharashtra